Bill Nilsson (17 December 1932 – 25 August 2013) was a Swedish professional motocross racer. He competed in the Motocross World Championships from 1952 to 1967. Nilsson was the first 500 cc motocross world champion after winning the inaugural 1957 championship sanctioned by the Fédération Internationale de Motocyclisme.

Career 

Nilsson was born in Hallstavik, Sweden. In the 1955 European motocross championship, Nilsson finished in second place, one point behind his BSA teammate John Draper. Nilsson converted an AJS 7R road racing machine into a motocross bike and rode it to win the inaugural F.I.M. 500 cc Motocross World Championship held in 1957.

Nilsson finished second to René Baeten in the 1958 world championship and second to Sten Lundin in the 1959 world championship before repeating as 500cc motocross world champion in 1960 riding a Husqvarna. In 1955, 1958 and 1961, he was a member of the Swedish teams that won the Motocross des Nations.

References

External links 
 Bill Nilsson interview

2013 deaths
1932 births
People from Norrtälje Municipality
Swedish motocross riders
Enduro riders
Sportspeople from Stockholm County